Salvatore Pinto (January 4, 1905 – October 5, 1966) was an American painter. His work was part of the painting event in the art competition at the 1936 Summer Olympics.

References

1905 births
1966 deaths
20th-century American painters
American male painters
Olympic competitors in art competitions
People from the Province of Salerno
Italian emigrants to the United States
20th-century American male artists